Manitou is an unincorporated community in Mountrail County, in the U.S. state of North Dakota.

History
Manitou was laid out in 1887 when the railroad was extended to that point. A post office called Manitou was in operation from 1905 until 1941.

References

Unincorporated communities in Mountrail County, North Dakota
Unincorporated communities in North Dakota